Aleksandr Belov (born 11 September 1981) is a Russian ski jumper. He competed in the normal hill and large hill events at the 2002 Winter Olympics.

References

1981 births
Living people
Russian male ski jumpers
Olympic ski jumpers of Russia
Ski jumpers at the 2002 Winter Olympics
Sportspeople from Ufa